Welsh singer and songwriter Marina Diamandis, known professionally as Marina and formerly Marina and the Diamonds, has released five studio albums, seven extended plays, 26 singles (including two as a featured artist), five promotional singles and 34 music videos.

In November 2007, Diamandis self-released her debut extended play, Mermaid vs Sailor via Myspace. The Crown Jewels EP followed in June 2009 on the independent label Neon Gold Records. After signing to 679 Recordings and Atlantic Records, she released her debut studio album, The Family Jewels, in February 2010. The album reached number five on the UK Albums Chart and was certified gold by both the British Phonographic Industry (BPI) and the Irish Recorded Music Association (IRMA). It was promoted by the singles "Mowgli's Road", "Hollywood", "I Am Not a Robot", "Oh No!" and "Shampain". "Hollywood" was the highest-peaking single from the album, reaching number 12 on the UK Singles Chart.

Diamandis' second studio album, Electra Heart, was released in April 2012, topping the charts in the United Kingdom, as well as the Irish Album Chart; it was certified gold in both countries. In the United States, it peaked at number 31 on the Billboard 200 and was certified gold by the Recording Industry Association of America (RIAA). The album spawned the singles "Primadonna", "Power & Control" and "How to Be a Heartbreaker". The first of these remains her highest-charting single in the UK at number 11, while charting at number three in Ireland and Austria. "Primadonna" was certified silver by the BPI, and platinum by the Australian Recording Industry Association (ARIA), IFPI Denmark and Recorded Music NZ. Both "Primadonna" and "How to Be a Heartbreaker" have been certified platinum by the RIAA.

Diamandis' third studio album, Froot, was released in March 2015. The album charted at numbers 10 and four in the UK and Ireland, respectively. It also reached number eight on the US Billboard 200, becoming her first album to reach that country's top 10. The album spawned five singles: "Froot", "Happy", "Forget", "I'm a Ruin" and "Blue". "I'm a Ruin" was the only single from Froot to chart in the UK, peaking at number 169. Her sixth EP, Froot Acoustic, was self-published in June 2015. In April 2019, Diamandis released her fourth studio album, Love + Fear. It reached number five and 28 in the UK and the US charts, respectively. The album's lead single, "Handmade Heaven" was a minor success, while the rest of the singles did not chart. Diamandis released a seventh EP, Love + Fear (Acoustic), which was released in September 2019. Ancient Dreams in a Modern Land followed as her fifth studio album in June 2021.

Studio albums

Extended plays

Singles

As lead artist

As featured artist

Promotional singles

Other charted or certified songs

Guest appearances

Special releases

Music videos

Notes
Notes for albums and songs

Notes for peak chart positions

References

External links
 
 
 
 

Discographies of British artists
Discography
Pop music discographies